is a former Japanese football player.

Football career
Suzumura was born in Nagoya on September 13, 1978. After graduating from high school, he joined newly was promoted to J1 League club, Vissel Kobe in 1997. Although he played as defensive midfielder in 1997, he could not play at all in the match in 1998 and retired from football career end of 1998 season.

Futsal career
After retirement from football career, he became a futsal player in 2000. He was selected Japan national futsal team in 2000. He played at AFC Futsal Championship for 9 years in a row (2000-2008). Japan team won the champions in 2006 and the 2nd place 5 times (2002, 2003, 2004, 2005 and 2007). He also played for Japan at 2004 Futsal World Championship.

Club statistics

References

External links

J.League

1978 births
Living people
Association football people from Aichi Prefecture
Japanese footballers
J1 League players
Vissel Kobe players
Association football midfielders